Joseph-Arthur Bradette (October 16, 1886 – September 12, 1961) was a Canadian politician, farmer and merchant. He was elected to the House of Commons of Canada in 1926 as a Member of the Liberal Party to represent the riding of Timiskaming North. He was re-elected in the elections of 1930, for the riding of Cochrane in 1935, 1940, 1945 and 1949. He lost in the election of 1925. He served as Deputy Speaker and Chairman of Committees of the Whole of the House of Commons between 1943 and 1945.

He was appointed to the senate on the advice of Prime Minister Louis St. Laurent in 1953 where he served until his death in 1961.

External links
 

1886 births
1961 deaths
Canadian senators from Ontario
Liberal Party of Canada MPs
Liberal Party of Canada senators
Members of the House of Commons of Canada from Ontario
Place of death missing